Monte Cassim (Ahmed Mumtaz Masoon Cassim) is a Sri Lankan academic. He is the Vice-Chancellor of the Ritsumeikan Trust and from April 2004 until January 2010 was  President of Ritsumeikan Asia Pacific University, Beppu, Japan where he remains Professor.

Educated in Sri Lanka at the Royal College, Colombo, he graduated from the University of Ceylon in 1970. After working as an architect for Valentine Gunasekerea's practice, he moved to Japan in 1971 as recipient of  a Japan Ministry of Education postgraduate scholarship and gained a masters from the University of Tokyo’s Graduate School of Engineering in 1976. Thereafter started doctoral studies there.

Following his studies he worked for Mitsui Construction and for the AUR urban and regional planning practice in Tokyo before taking up a teaching position at the Universiti Sains Malaysia in Penang. He joined the United Nations Centre for Regional Development in Nagoya 1985 and worked there until 1994. That year he joined Ritsumeikan University as Professor in 1994 in the Faculty of International Relations (1994-1996) and the Faculty of Policy Science. His research centers on process analysis, systems design and knowledge management to develop “earth-friendly” and “human-friendly” technological solutions at Ritsumeikan’s Discovery Research Laboratory. He became President of Ritsumeikan Asia Pacific University (APU) and Vice-Chancellor of Ritsumeikan Trust in 2004.

References

Sri Lankan academic administrators
Sri Lankan expatriates in Japan
Alumni of Royal College, Colombo
Living people
1947 births
University of Tokyo alumni
20th-century Sri Lankan architects
21st-century Sri Lankan architects